Melovatka is a rural locality (a selo) and the administrative center of Melovatskoye Rural Settlement, Zhirnovsky District, Volgograd Oblast, Russia. The population was 341 as of 2010. There are 3 streets.

Geography 
Melovatka is located 24 km southwest of Zhirnovsk (the district's administrative centre) by road. Nizhnyaya Dobrinka is the nearest rural locality.

References 

Rural localities in Zhirnovsky District